The Rauchua (also: Большая Бараниха Bolshaya Baranikha) is a river in Far East Siberia, Russia.

Remains of frozen mammoths have been found near the Rauchua.

Course
Its source is in the Ilirney Range.
It passes through the sparsely populated areas of the Siberian tundra and flows northwards into the Kolyma Gulf, East Siberian Sea, not far west from Ayon Island.

The Rauchua and its tributaries belong to the Chukotka Autonomous Okrug administrative region of Russia.

References

 River description & location
 Mammoths 
  

Rivers of Chukotka Autonomous Okrug
Drainage basins of the East Siberian Sea